Historical Studies in the Natural Sciences is a peer-reviewed academic journal published by the University of California Press on behalf of the Office for History of Science and Technology (University of California, Berkeley). It was established as Chymia in 1948, being published under than name until 1967 when it temporarily ceased publication. It resumed under Historical Studies in the Physical Sciences in 1969, renaming itself Historical Studies in the Physical and Biological Sciences in 1986 under John L. Heilbron, an acquiring its current name in 2008.

It covers the study of the intellectual and social history of the physical sciences (including physics, chemistry, and astronomy) and the biological sciences (including biology, biophysics, and genetics), from the 17th century to the modern era.

Russell McCormmach, who edited the first ten annual volumes of Historical Studies in the Physical Sciences. John L. Heilbron took over as editor in 1980 and in 1985 added "Biological" to the title. In 2008, Cathryn Carson took over as editor-in-chief.

Abstracting and indexing 
The journal is abstracted and indexed in:

According to the Journal Citation Reports, the journal has a 2018 impact factor of 0.417.

References

External links
 

History of science journals
University of California Press academic journals
Publications established in 1948
English-language journals
5 times per year journals